Limitless is an American comedy-drama television series that aired on CBS for one season from 2015 to 2016. It is a spin-off of the 2011 film Limitless, and takes place four years after the movie's events. The series stars Jake McDorman as Brian Finch, who discovers a mysterious nootropic drug NZT-48, which unlocks the full potential of the human brain and gives its user enhanced mental faculties. 

Limitless premiered on CBS on September 22, 2015 to mixed reviews from critics. After a single 22-episode season that ended on April 26, 2016, showrunner Craig Sweeny announced that CBS had cancelled the series.

Premise
Brian Finch, a 28-year-old burnout and struggling musician, is introduced to NZT-48, a miracle drug that gives him access to every neuron in his brain. For twelve hours after taking the pill, he becomes the smartest person in the world, able to perfectly recall every detail of his life and capable of prodigious leaps of intuition and reasoning. With the mysterious US Senator Eddie Morra providing him with an immunity shot to counteract NZT's deadly side effects, Brian uses his enhanced abilities to help FBI Special Agent Rebecca Harris. The FBI doesn't know about the shot and Brian has to struggle to keep both worlds separate.

Cast and characters

Main
 Jake McDorman as Brian Finch
 Jennifer Carpenter as FBI Special Agent Rebecca Harris
 Hill Harper as FBI Special Agent Spelman Boyle, named for Spelman College.
 Mary Elizabeth Mastrantonio as FBI Special Agent in Charge Nasreen "Naz" Pouran, of Iranian origin, commander of the Cross Jurisdictional Command (CJC) team

Recurring
 Bradley Cooper as U.S. Senator Edward "Eddie" Morra, the original protagonist from the 2011 film
 Lio Tipton as Shauna, Brian's ex-girlfriend
 Ron Rifkin as Dennis Finch, Brian's father
 Blair Brown as Marie Finch, Brian's mother
 Megan Guinan as Rachel Finch, Brian's sister
 Tom Degnan as FBI Agent Jason "Ike", Mike's partner and Brian's bodyguard
 Michael James Shaw as FBI Agent Daryl "Mike", Ike's partner and Brian's bodyguard
 Colin Salmon as Jarrod Sands, a former MI6 officer who now works as a fixer for Morra
 Desmond Harrington as SWAT Agent Casey Rooks
 Georgina Haig as Piper Baird
 Michael Devine as James "Tech" Padgett
 Henry Gagliardi as young Brian Finch

Episodes

Production

Development
On October 31, 2014, it was announced that actor Bradley Cooper had decided to develop a television series based on a movie, and had teamed with Alex Kurtzman and Roberto Orci to develop the concept. CBS Television Studios was shopping the show to the American broadcast networks. Craig Sweeny would write the series, while Cooper would serve as executive producer. CBS ordered a pilot on January 28, 2015. In addition to Cooper, Kurtzman, Orci, and Sweeny served as executive producers for the series, which is set 4 years after the original film. On February 3, 2015, it was announced that Marc Webb would direct the pilot.

Casting
On February 26, 2015, it was announced that Jake McDorman had joined the production as Brian Finch. Several additional cast members were announced in March 2015. Jennifer Carpenter plays FBI Special Agent Rebecca Harris. Hill Harper is FBI Special Agent Spelman Boyle. Finally, Mary Elizabeth Mastrantonio was cast as FBI Special Agent in Charge Nasreen "Naz" Pouran, of Iranian origin commander of the Cross Jurisdictional Command (CJC) team.

Broadcast
The premiere of Limitless was broadcast in the U.S. on CBS on September 22, 2015. In Canada, the show was simulcast with the American broadcast, which was aired on Global. In Brazil, the TV station Space aired the series on October 1, 2015. The series premiered in Australia on Network Ten on October 11, 2015. In Italy, the series aired on January 3, 2016 on Rai 2. In the United Kingdom and Ireland, the series aired on February 17, 2016 on Sky One.

Reception
Limitless received mixed reviews from critics. The review aggregator website Rotten Tomatoes reports a 57% approval rating with an average rating of 6.39/10 based on 47 reviews. The website's critics' consensus reads, "Even with a likable hero, Limitless cannot overcome its credulity-straining premise and shaky, hole-riddled narrative." On Metacritic, the series holds an average score of 57 out of 100 based on 30 critics.

Ratings

Notes

References

External links
 
 

2010s American comedy-drama television series
2010s American comic science fiction television series
2010s American crime drama television series
2015 American television series debuts
2016 American television series endings
American crime comedy television series
American thriller television series
CBS original programming
English-language television shows
K/O Paper Products films
Live action television shows based on films
Smart drugs in fiction
Television series about the Federal Bureau of Investigation
Television series by CBS Studios
Television shows about drugs
Television shows set in New York City